Nuclear pore complex protein Nup98-Nup96 is a protein that in humans is encoded by the NUP98 gene.

Function 

Signal-mediated nuclear import and export proceed through the nuclear pore complex (NPC), which is composed of approximately 30 unique proteins collectively known as nucleoporins. The 98 kD nucleoporin is generated through a biogenesis pathway that involves synthesis and proteolytic cleavage of a 186 kD precursor protein. This cleavage results in the 98 kD nucleoporin as well as a 96 kD nucleoporin, both of which are localized to the nucleoplasmic side of the NPC. Rat studies show that the 98 kD nucleoporin functions as one of several docking site nucleoporins of transport substrates. The human gene has been shown to fuse to several genes following chromosome translocations in acute myelogenous leukemia (AML) and T-cell acute lymphocytic leukemia (T-ALL). This gene is one of several genes located in the imprinted gene domain of 11p15.5, an important tumor-suppressor gene region. Alterations in this region have been associated with the Beckwith-Wiedemann syndrome, Wilms tumor, rhabdomyosarcoma, adrenocortical carcinoma, and lung, ovarian, and breast cancer. Alternative splicing of this gene results in several transcript variants; however, not all variants have been fully described.

Interactions 

NUP98 has been shown to interact with:
 CREB-binding protein, 
 KPNB1, 
 NUP88, 
 RAE1,  and
 TNPO2.

References

Further reading 

 
 
 
 
 
 
 
 
 
 
 
 
 
 
 
 
 
 
 

Nuclear pore complex